Briana Nichole Williams (born March 21, 2002) is an American-born sprinter competing for Jamaica in the 100 metres and 200 metres. She became the youngest athlete to win the women's 100 metres and 200 metres double at the 2018 World Under-20 Championships in Tampere at age 16.

She holds the girls' 100 metres age-15 world record with a time of 11.13 seconds, set in March 2018. She is  the Jamaican under-18 and under-20 record holder in the women's 200 metres, and was Jamaica"s under-18 and under-20 record holder in the women's 100 metres with personal bests of 22.50 seconds and 10.97 seconds respectively.

Athletics career

2018
On March 17 at the Bob Hayes Invitational in Jacksonville, Florida, Williams broke the world age-15 record in the girls' 100 metres, winning in a time of 11.13 seconds. The previous record had been 11.17 seconds, set almost 27 years prior by Marion Jones on 1 June 1991.

Two weeks later she earned gold medals in the 100 metres, the 200 metres, and the  metres relay at the 2018 CARIFTA Games in the under-17 category, setting championship records in the 100 metres and  relay.

In July she became the youngest athlete ever to win both the women's 100 metres and the 200 metres at the 2018 IAAF World U20 Championships in Tampere.

2019
At the 2019 CARIFTA Games in April, Williams again tripled in the 100 m, 200 m, and  relay to win three gold medals in the under-20 category.

On 1 June, Williams set a new Jamaican under-18 and under-20 record in the women's 100 metres at the JAC Open in Jacksonville, Florida, improving on Kiara Grant's under-20 record set the month prior by one hundredth of a second to 11.10 seconds. Grant took the record back a week later at the NCAA Division I Championships in Austin, Texas with a 11.04 seconds finish in the final, but less than an hour later Williams improved the record to 11.02 seconds at the Great Southwest Classic in Albuquerque, New Mexico.

Williams ran 10.94 s in the 100 m final at the Jamaican Championships on 21 June 2019, which would have set the world under-18 best time and improved her Jamaican under-20 record. However, she tested positive for the banned diuretic hydrochlorothiazide during the competition. While she was ruled to be not at fault and received no period of ineligibility to compete, her results from the Jamaican Championships were deleted from the records.

2021
Williams improved her official Jamaican under-20 record of 11.02 seconds in the women's 100 metres at the JAC Summer Open in Jacksonville, Florida on 30 May, clocking 11.19 seconds in the prelims and then winning the final in 11.01 seconds. A day later in the American Track League at the same track she ran 10.97 in the prelims, but the time was assisted by a +2.5 m/s wind, making it ineligible for record purposes which allow no more than a +2.0 m/s wind velocity. In the final she clocked 10.98 seconds to win with only a +1.0 m/s wind, setting her second Jamaican under-20 record in two days. In June 2021, Williams placed fourth at the Jamaican National Championships with a time of 11.01 in the 100 metres, thus not qualifying for the 2020 Summer Olympics in that event. However, she competed at the Olympics as a part of the 4 x 100 metres relay team, winning the gold medal.

Awards and recognition
Williams earned the Austin Sealy award at the CARIFTA Games in 2018 and then 2019 for her records set and gold medals earned in the 100 metres, 200 metres, and 4 × 100 metres relay in both editions. She was the first Jamaican athlete to win the award two years in a row since Usain Bolt in 2004.

For her athletics achievements in 2018 she was nominated for the IAAF Female Rising Star and the Laureus Breakthrough of the Year awards.

Statistics
Information from World Athletics profile unless otherwise noted.

Personal bests

International championship results
CR = championship record
PB = personal best
SB = seasonal best
NU20R = national (Jamaican) under-20 record
NU18R = national under-18 record

National championship results
PB = personal best
DQ = disqualified

Seasonal bests
w = wind-assisted (over +2.0 m/s)

Notes

References
 https://jamaica.loopnews.com/content/i-gave-it-my-all-tonight-says-brianna-after-4th-jamaica-trials

External links

2002 births
Living people
American people of Jamaican descent
African-American female track and field athletes
Jamaican female sprinters
Track and field athletes from Miami
World Athletics U20 Championships winners
Athletes (track and field) at the 2020 Summer Olympics
Medalists at the 2020 Summer Olympics
Olympic gold medalists in athletics (track and field)
Olympic gold medalists for Jamaica
Olympic athletes of Jamaica
21st-century African-American sportspeople
21st-century African-American women